Trygve Smith can refer to:

 Trygve Smith (footballer) (1892–1963), Norwegian footballer
 Trygve Smith (tennis) (1880–1948), Norwegian tennis player
 Trygve Smith, ski jumper and brother of Harald Smith